Greenpeace, Salvemos al Mediterráneo (English: Let's save the Mediterranean Sea) is a compilation album by various singers with benefits to the non-governmental organization Greenpeace. It was released in 1986. It was edited only in Spain in LP format. The only unpublished song was the one by Mecano.

Track listing
 Side A:
 Mediterráneo (Joan Manuel Serrat) 3:58
 A por el mar (Luis Eduardo Aute) 3:25
 ¡Es la guerra! (Orquesta Mondragón) 3:22
 Una décima de segundo (Nacha Pop) 3:20
 El viento de África (Radio Futura) 3:30
 La leyenda del tiempo (Camarón) 3:38
 Entre dos aguas (Paco de Lucía) 6:03
 Sin aire (Ramoncín) 3:50

 Side B:
 Antinuclear (Miguel Ríos) 3:34
 Pronto viviremos en la Luna (Víctor Manuel) 4:31
 Planeta Agua (Ana Belén) 4:16
 ¿Cómo pudiste hacerme esto a mi? (Alaska y Dinarama) 4:05
 No te puedo besar (Hombres G) 3:43
 Danza de la primavera (Maria del Mar Bonet) 3:14
 Maremar (Lluís Llach) 6:48
 Canción cortita para antes que nos abandone el mar (Mecano) 0:57

References

1986 compilation albums
Pop compilation albums
Compilation albums by Spanish artists
RCA Records compilation albums